Rytov or Rõtov (Estonian transliteration) is a Slavic masculine surname, its feminine counterpart is Rytova or Rõtova. It may refer to:
Boris Rõtov (1937–1987), Estonian chess player
Galina Rytova (born 1975), Russian-Kazakhstani water polo player
Merike Rõtova (born 1936), Estonian chess player, wife of Boris
Mikhail Rytov (born 1984), Russian football player
Sergei Mikhailovich Rytov (1908-1996), Soviet physicist, credited for
Rytov number
Rytov transformation

References

Russian-language surnames